Sardargardh state  Bantva was a princely state  founded in 1733 by Khan Shri Sherzamankhanji Babi youngest son of Nawab Saheb Salabat Muhammadkhan Babi of Junagadh State, on the Kathiawar peninsula in Gujarat, India. It had an area of approximately 186 km2, and contained 13 primarily Muslim villages. It was a non-salute state.

Upon independence in 1947, the princely states were forced to join either India or Pakistan. Sardargardh Bantva acceded to Pakistan in September 1947, and then rescinded the accession and re-acceded to India on 15 February 1948. The last ruler was Khan shri Hussain Yavarkhanji babi.

See also
Memon
Bantva
Bantva Manavadar
Memoni
Pathans of Gujarat

References

Princely states of India
Memon
History of Gujarat
States and territories established in 1760
States and territories disestablished in 1947
Pashtun dynasties